Lauder is a town in the Scottish Borders 27 miles south east of Edinburgh.

Lauder may also refer to:
 Lauder (surname)
 Lauder, Manitoba, a small community in Cameron Rural Municipality, Manitoba, Canada
 Lauder, New Zealand, a small community in Central Otago, New Zealand
 Lauder Baronets
 Lauder College or Carnegie College
 Lauder Institute
 Lauder Schools of Prague

See also
 Lauter (disambiguation)
 Lauda (disambiguation)